Switzerland does not have a national honour system. Enshrined in the 1848 Swiss Constitution in Article 12 was a prohibition on the acceptance of honours and titles by Swiss citizens. In the current Swiss constitution there is no specific prohibition on titles and orders, however there is a statute that covers the prohibition previously covered by Article 12.

The Swiss military maintains a system of awards which recognize length of service, training, sports, and mission participation.

Award ribbons

Length of Service Decorations

Exceptional service

Decorations
These ribbons are worn in place of the older Sugus type badges (called that way because of their sugus-like rectangular shape and because a decoration is like a sweet). Exception: the former Alpine Insignia looked different and was replaced by the sugus type.

Mission insignia

Off-duty activities

Source:

Order of wear
Awards are worn on the uniform as ribbon bars in rows of three, with a maximum of nine ribbons worn at a time.  When the top row of ribbons is less than three, they are worn to the wearers left. Only the highest level of award received is worn. The ribbons are worn in the following order:

Length of Service Decoration (max 1 Ribbon);
Decorations:
Exceptional service
Skill-at-arms Decorations
Training Decorations (including Alpine training)
Sports Decorations
Mission Insignia:
Operations within Switzerland (max 1 Ribbon)
Operations Abroad;
UN/OSCE Mandate Missions (max 1 per ribbon)
Partnership for Peace Mission Insignia
Long Leave for Military Duties Abroad (LAK)

References

External links
Ribbons (Auszeichnungen) (German)
Reglement Abzeichen der Schweizer Armee, 2023

Military of Switzerland
Switzerland
Orders, decorations, and medals of Switzerland